Mary Lou Piatek and Anne White were the defending champions but only Piatek – now married with the surname of Daniels – competed that year with Barbara Gerken.

Daniels and Gerken lost in the first round to Hu Na and Stephanie Rehe.

Lori McNeil and Eva Pfaff won in the final 2–6, 6–4, 7–5 against Gigi Fernández and Zina Garrison.

Seeds
Champion seeds are indicated in bold text while text in italics indicates the round in which those seeds were eliminated.

 Gigi Fernández /  Zina Garrison (final)
 Elise Burgin /  Robin White (semifinals)
 Lori McNeil /  Eva Pfaff (champions)
 Leila Meskhi /  Svetlana Parkhomenko (semifinals)

Draw

References
 1988 Virginia Slims of Dallas Doubles Draw

Virginia Slims of Dallas
1988 WTA Tour